Sydney Football Club, an association football club based in Moore Park, Sydney, was founded in 2004. They became the first member from Sydney admitted into the A-League in 2005. The club's first team have competed in numerous national and international organised competitions, and all players who have played between 1 and 24 such matches are listed below.

Since Sydney FC's first competitive match, more than 100 players have failed to reach 25 appearances for the club. Many of these players spent only a short period of their career at Sydney FC before seeking opportunities in other teams. Lucas Neill made three appearances for the club before his injury cut his season short and had earned 96 full international caps for his country.

Key
 The list is ordered first by date of debut, and then if necessary in alphabetical order.
 Appearances as a substitute are included.
 Statistics are correct up to and including the match played on 14 January 2023. Where a player left the club permanently after this date, his statistics are updated to his date of leaving.

Players

Players highlighted in bold are still actively playing at Sydney FC.

References
General
 
 
 

Specific

 
Lists of soccer players by club in Australia
Sydney-sport-related lists
Association football player non-biographical articles